This is a list of Panjabi films of the 1950s. For a complete alphabetical list, see :Category:Punjabi films''.

1950s

External links 
 Punjabi films at the Internet Movie Database

1950s
Lists of 1950s films
Films